Qodratabad (also Romanized as Qodratābād; also known as Qodratābād-e Salār Mīzārī) is a village in Azizabad Rural District, in the Central District of Narmashir County, Kerman Province, Iran. At the 2006 census, its population was 603, in 117 families.

References 

Populated places in Narmashir County